Tyler Paul Seguin (born January 31, 1992) is a Canadian professional ice hockey centre and alternate captain for the Dallas Stars of the National Hockey League (NHL). Seguin was selected second overall in the 2010 NHL Entry Draft by the Boston Bruins and went on to win the 2011 Stanley Cup in his rookie season. He finished the 2011–12 season in Boston with a plus-minus of +34, the second highest in the NHL.

During the 2012–13 NHL lockout, Seguin played for EHC Biel of the Swiss National League A (NLA) and finished the season with 25 goals, the most on the team. In 2013, Seguin played in his second Stanley Cup Finals in three seasons, ultimately losing the series to the Chicago Blackhawks. On July 4, 2013, Seguin was traded by the Bruins to the Dallas Stars for a package of players including Loui Eriksson and Reilly Smith.

Early life
Seguin was born in Brampton, Ontario in 1992, but his family moved to Whitby when he was young to follow his father's career. His father Paul played college ice hockey for the University of Vermont, where he was roommates with future National Hockey League (NHL) star John LeClair, while his mother Jackie was a centre for the Brampton Canadettes Girls Hockey Association as a child. Tyler and his sisters Candace and Cassidy all played hockey growing up. All three played at centre like their mother, while Paul was a defenceman.

Seguin began playing hockey in a house league at the age of five or six, and developed a love for the sport from a young age. His minor ice hockey career began with the Wildcats of the Ontario Minor Hockey Association, and after moving back to Brampton at the age of 10, Seguin played three seasons with the Toronto Nationals of the Greater Toronto Hockey League (GTHL) alongside future Calder Trophy winner Jeff Skinner. Seguin also spent four years at St. Michael's College School in Toronto. He had his sights set on playing hockey at the University of Michigan, and believed that St. Michael's would be a good stepping stone towards that goal.

Playing career

Amateur
The Plymouth Whalers of the Ontario Hockey League (OHL) drafted Seguin in the first round, ninth overall, of the 2008 OHL Priority Selection Draft. He chose to join the Whalers rather than attend college as he had originally planned, and began skating on the fourth line in the 2008–09 season. He struggled in his rookie junior ice hockey year, scoring only one goal in the first 17 games of the season. After Mike Vellucci returned to coach the Whalers and moved Seguin to the top two lines, his performance improved, and Seguin finished the season with 67 points in 61 games.

2009–10 proved to be a breakout year for Seguin, who led the league with 14 goals and 25 points in the first 10 games of the season. Eleven of those points came from the first four games of the season, including a hat trick against the London Knights. He finished the season with 106 points (48 goals and 58 assists) in 63 games, and, although the Whalers were swept in the second round of the 2010 playoffs, Seguin became the first member of the team to win the Red Tilson Trophy for most outstanding player in the OHL since David Legwand in 1998. He also tied with Taylor Hall of the Windsor Spitfires for that year's Eddie Powers Memorial Trophy, given to the top scorer in the OHL. At the 2010 CHL Top Prospects Game, Seguin was named the captain for Team Orr, which lost 4–2 to Team Cherry.

Professional

Draft
Going into the 2010 NHL Entry Draft, Seguin and Hall were considered the top two available players, with no consensus which one would become the first overall draft pick. Both players were tied for points scoring in the OHL for the previous season, while draft reports tended to emphasize Seguin's speed and Hall's strength. Danny Flynn of Bleacher Report referred to Seguin as an "elite playmaker" who lacked "skill on the defensive end", whereas Hall had proven his "greatness on the big stage", but had "shown a tendency to be selfish at times". Preliminary rankings from the NHL Central Scouting Bureau ranked Seguin the top OHL prospect, and Hall second. Although their positions switched during the midterm rankings, Seguin was named the No. 1 prospect in the bureau's final April rankings. Seguin ended up being selected second overall by the Boston Bruins, while Hall was taken first by the Edmonton Oilers.

Boston Bruins

Shortly after being drafted, Seguin signed a three-year, $3.75 million entry-level contract with the Bruins, the maximum allowed for a contract of that nature. He made his NHL debut on October 9, 2010, with four shots on goal in a 5–2 loss to the Phoenix Coyotes. He scored his first professional goal the next day, receiving the puck on a pass from teammate Michael Ryder in the third period and scoring on a breakaway backhanded goal against goaltender Ilya Bryzgalov in a 3–0 shutout of the Coyotes.

Seguin participated in the 2011 All-Star festivities during the Rookie Skills Competition. Late in the 2010–11 season, Seguin was quoted as having a desire to model his NHL playing style on that of teammate Patrice Bergeron.

After being a healthy scratch for the first two rounds of the 2011 Stanley Cup playoffs, Seguin was included in the Boston lineup to start Round 3, the Eastern Conference Finals, against the Tampa Bay Lightning after centreman Patrice Bergeron sustained a mild concussion. Seguin scored a goal and added an assist in his first game played, then followed that up with two goals and two assists in his second game. He became the first teenager to score four points in a Stanley Cup playoff game since Trevor Linden did so for the Vancouver Canucks in 1989. On June 15, 2011, Boston won the Stanley Cup in the Finals, prevailing over Vancouver in a 4–3 series victory.

On November 5, 2011, Seguin scored his first career NHL hat trick against the team that traded the draft pick to the Bruins, the Toronto Maple Leafs. On November 14, Seguin was named NHL's First Star of the Week for his four goals and two assists that helped the Bruins to three wins in the week. On December 8, he played in his 100th career NHL game against the Florida Panthers. On April 22, 2012, Seguin scored in overtime of Game 6 of the Bruins' Eastern Conference Quarterfinals series against the Washington Capitals that sent the series to a Game 7. However, despite another goal from Seguin in Game 7, the Bruins would go on to lose the game in overtime and were thus eliminated from the playoffs. He finished the 2011–12 season as the Bruins' leading scorer.

During the 2012–13 NHL lockout, Seguin was one of many Bruins who signed European hockey contracts, striking a deal with the EHC Biel hockey club of the Swiss National League A on September 21, 2012. He made his Swiss League debut on September 30, centreing Ahren Spylo and Eric Beaudoin on the second line and scoring an assist in a 6–3 loss to the Rapperswil-Jona Lakers. Seguin's first goal with the team came three days later, in the first period of his second appearance, a 2–1 win over EV Zug. Less than one month later, on October 24, Seguin recorded his second professional hat trick, and his first NLA hat trick, in a 5–4 shootout win over HC Ambri-Piotta. By November 27, he had accumulated 20 goals in 20 games, the most of any NHL lockout export to the NLA.

On December 28, 2012, Seguin told NBC Sports Boston that, after representing Team Canada at the 2012 Spengler Cup, he would leave EHC Biel and return to the Bruins. In 29 NLA games that season, Seguin scored 25 goals and 15 assists. He also befriended his teammate Patrick Kane, who returned to the Chicago Blackhawks upon the conclusion of the lockout.

After the lockout ended, the 2012–13 NHL season began, with 48 intra-conference games played beginning January 19, 2013. Seguin played all 48 regular-season games with the Bruins, scoring 16 goals and 16 assists while playing on a line with Patrice Bergeron and Brad Marchand. His performance began to waver during the 2013 Stanley Cup playoffs, however, scoring only one goal and three assists in his first 12 postseason games, and he was moved from the second to the third line with Rich Peverley and Chris Kelly, with Jaromir Jagr taking his place on the second. The Bruins advanced to the 2013 Stanley Cup finals, but ultimately fell to the Blackhawks in six games.

Dallas Stars

On July 4, 2013, shortly after the Stanley Cup finals, Seguin was part of a massive seven-player trade that sent him, Peverley, and defenceman Ryan Button to the Dallas Stars in exchange for forward Loui Eriksson and prospects Joe Morrow, Reilly Smith, and Matt Fraser. Prior to the trade, rumors had begun to circulate that the Bruins were displeased with Seguin's supposed hard-partying lifestyle, particularly when his on-ice performance began to suffer during the playoffs. General manager Peter Chiarelli spoke in a press conference on July 4 to assert that, although the trade was "not a strict on-ice decision", but that concerns of Seguin's behavior were more related to "focus, just about little things, about preparing to play, it was nothing about extracurricular activities".

The 2013–14 NHL season proved a breakout for Seguin, who became fast friends with captain Jamie Benn. On November 14, 2013, Seguin had his first career four-point game, scoring two goals and two assists in a 7–3 rout of the Calgary Flames. After reaching 30 goals for the third straight season, Seguin sustained a cut to his Achilles tendon on March 17, 2016, and was expected to miss 3–4 weeks at the end of the season. He set career highs in goals, with 34, and assists, with 47, and his 84 season points were the fourth-highest in the NHL. At the conclusion of the season, Seguin came in sixth overall in voting for the Hart Memorial Trophy, given to the "player judged most valuable to his team". He was also nominated for the King Clancy Memorial Trophy, given for leadership and humanitarianism; the award ultimately went to Andrew Ference of the Edmonton Oilers.

Seguin was named to the NHL All-Star Game for the fifth time on January 10, 2018. He was previously selected for the 2012, 2015, 2016, and 2017 NHL All-Star games. At the end of the 2017–18 season, Seguin was nominated for the King Clancy Memorial Trophy for the second time.

On September 13, 2018, Seguin signed an eight-year, $78.8 million contract extension with the Stars.

After blocking a shot on March 12, 2020, one of the final games before the suspension of the regular NHL season, Seguin suffered two tears in his right vastus lateralis muscle. He chose to refrain from lower body workouts during the league pause in the hopes that the injury would resolve itself. On July 29, during a practice before the Stars' exhibition game against the Nashville Predators, Seguin felt a "pop" in his hip that also caused pain in his knee. After playing through the 2020 Stanley Cup playoffs, scoring only two goals in 26 games, Seguin was told that he had completely torn his acetabular labrum. Due to restrictions surrounding the COVID-19 pandemic, Seguin's surgery was repeatedly delayed. Seguin received a right hip arthroscopy and labral repair on November 2, 2020. The expected timeline for his rehabilitation and recovery was subsequently adjusted from four to five months, due to the severity of the injury.

Seguin returned to play on May 3, 2021, scoring a goal in the Stars' 5–4 overtime loss against the Florida Panthers.

International play

Seguin's first international ice hockey tournament appearance was at the 2009 World U-17 Hockey Challenge, representing Canada Ontario. Seguin led the tournament with eight assists, and scored the first goal in Canada Ontario's 5–1 gold medal victory over Canada Pacific. That May, he received an invitation to the Canada U18 selection camp.

Seguin competed for Canada at the 2009 Ivan Hlinka Memorial Tournament in the Czech Republic, where he led the team in scoring with ten points in four games as Canada won the gold medal. He then attended Hockey Canada's selection camp for the 2010 World Junior Ice Hockey Championships in December 2009, but did not make the team. Previously, he won gold with Team Ontario in the 2009 World U-17 Hockey Challenge in Port Alberni, British Columbia, and finished second in tournament scoring with 11 points in six games. Seguin attended Canada's World Junior selection camp in Regina, Saskatchewan, for the World Junior Championships, the under-20 level, but again failed to make the team. In 2015, he was a member of Canada's gold medal-winning team at the World Hockey Championships.

Personal life
After wearing a No. 9 jersey in his childhood, Seguin chose to wear No. 19 when he reached the NHL, as a tribute to his favorite player, Steve Yzerman. When he was traded to Dallas, where No. 19 was retired in honor of Bill Masterton, he flipped the numbers, and wears No. 91. He is the second player to wear No. 91 in franchise history, following Brad Richards.

Seguin is sponsored by Dunkin Donuts, Adidas, Bauer Hockey and BioSteel Sports Supplements. In 2014, Seguin bought Mike Modano's Dallas home.

In 2017, Seguin made a cameo appearance in the movie Goon: Last of the Enforcers.

Philanthropy
As the result of one of his best friends suffering a severe spinal cord injury in December 2012, Seguin founded Seguin's Stars upon arriving in Dallas. At every Stars home game during the season, Seguin donated a luxury suite, along with food and beverage, for individuals with spinal cord injuries. Seguin's Stars, along with Dallas Stars Foundation also donated a luxury suite to the Big Brothers Big Sisters organization in 2015 and 2017.  At the conclusion of every game, Seguin meets his special guests outside of the Stars' locker room for autographs and pictures, often with other members of the team.

Career statistics

Regular season and playoffs

International

Awards and honours

References

External links

 
 

1992 births
Boston Bruins draft picks
Boston Bruins players
Canadian ice hockey centres
Dallas Stars players
EHC Biel players
Franco-Ontarian people
Ice hockey people from Ontario
Living people
National Hockey League first-round draft picks
National Hockey League All-Stars
Plymouth Whalers players
Sportspeople from Brampton
Stanley Cup champions
Canadian expatriate ice hockey players in Switzerland